Khalid Muhammad Ishaq  (16 August 1926 – 7 February 2004), Senior Advocate Supreme Court, was a Pakistani jurist and scholar of law, Islamic studies and literature.

Education
Muhammad graduated with a degree in Arabic from D. J. Science College in 1945. He received the first position in MA examinations given by the Bombay University. Later, he did his LLB at the SC Shahani Law College.

Life and career
Muhammad was born on 16 August 1926 in Shikarpur, Sindh to Mohammed Ishaq and Begum Talat Farrukh Ahmed Ishaq. His maternal grandfather was Maulvi Ziauddin Ahmed who was the first Indian to serve as DIG of Bombay Sind Presidency.

Ishaq's first marriage was to an Italian lady. His second marriage was with Begum Khursheed Ishaq. He has two daughters and two sons. Ishaq started legal practice in 1948. In 1958, when he was only 32 years of age, he was appointed Additional Advocate General of West Pakistan. Five years later, he was promoted to Advocate General. In 1964, Ishaq stepped down from that position and established his own practice. He practiced civil law in the High Court of Sindh and the Supreme Court of Pakistan. He became president of the High Court Bar Association in 1965. Ishaq died in Karachi in 2004.

Scholarship
Since Islam was his inspiration, Ishaq's chief interest lay in Persian and Arabic. In 1965, he became the project director of the Islamic Research Institute. He was a member of the Council of Islamic Ideology Pakistan from 1969 to 1972, and again from 1977 to 1980. Ishaq taught at the Sindh University from 1976 to 1977 as a Professor of Seerut-un-Nabi. He also appeared in scores of television programmes which dealt with legal and religious problems.

Ishaq had a large collection of commentaries on the Quran. His private library, until 1999, contained 175,000 volumes, making him the owner of one of the biggest collection of books in Pakistan. Many institutions requested that he donate his collection but he refused to part with his books. The books were donated to Lahore University of Management Sciences (LUMS) in 2005. Lahore University of Management Sciences (LUMS) has dedicated the first floor of its library as the "Khalid Ishaq Wing" in recognition of the massive donation of books.

Students and associates
Men and women from Ishap's chambers have become leading jurists in their own right. Among his associates who were elevated to the superior judiciary were Justice Abdul Qadir Sheikh, Justice Amir Raza, Justice Nasir Aslam Zahid, Justice Majida Rizvi, the late Justice Nizam Ahmed, Justice Sabihuddin Ahmed, Justice Ghulam Nabi Soomro, Justice Mujeebullah Siddiqui, Justice Amir Hani Muslim and Justice Mushtaq Memon.

Many students cite Khalid Ishaq as their mentor, teacher and colleague, including Abdul Hafeez Lakho, Muneer Malik, Shehenshah Hussain, Ahsan Zaheer Rizvi, Khalid Ibrahim, Abdul G. Soomro, Abid Zuberi, Faisal Kamal Alam, Arshad Hussain Khan, Ghulam Sarwar Jenjer, Muhammad Ehsan, Sohail Jabbar Malik and Khalid Ishaq's son, Sohaib Khalid Ishaq. Khalida Ghous did her Ph.D. thesis under his supervision.

An important feature of his life was the weekly meeting of 20 to 30 people at his home every Sunday from 9:00 AM to 1:00 PM. These meetings, which were held for almost 40 years and terminated only a few weeks before his death, were a kind of intellectual forum where the current issues were discussed freely. Among the regular participants were the journalists, Salahuddin, the editor of weekly Takbir, Major Ibn ul-Hasan, a columnist of that time and Nusrat Mirza, educators Abd ul-Qadeer Saleem, Molana Amir Usmani and Molan Tasin and businessmen Riaz Shafi, and Saeed Ahmad of Anchor Shipping. Iqbal Shah DSP (r), a renowned Sind police officer unfairly retired in Ayub Khan's martial law who was considered by Ishaq to be an expert in Allama Iqbal' s writings, attended these meetings as well.

References

External links
 Tribute to Khalid Ishaque
 Khalid Ishaq remembered
 Full court reference held for Khalid Ishaq
 Khalid Ishaq's death condoled

Sindhi people
20th-century Pakistani lawyers
Pakistani activists
Pakistani scholars
2004 deaths
1926 births
People from Shikarpur District
Lawyers from Karachi